The Department of Health, Housing, Local Government and Community Services was an Australian government department that existed between March and December 1993.

The Department was created when the local government functions of the Department of Immigration, Local Government and Ethnic Affairs joined with the Department of Health, Housing and Community Services.

Scope
Information about the department's functions and/or government funding allocation could be found in the Administrative Arrangements Orders, the annual Portfolio Budget Statements and in the Department's annual reports.

According to the Administrative Arrangements Order (AAO) made on 24 March 1993, the Department dealt with:
Services for the aged, people with disabilities and families with children 
Community support services 
Housing 
Public health and medical research 
Health promotion and disease prevention 
Pharmaceutical benefits 
Health benefits schemes 
Specific health services, including human quarantine 
National drug abuse strategy 
Matters relating to local government.

Structure
The Department was an Australian Public Service department, staffed by officials who were responsible to the Minister. The Ministers were Graham Richardson 
and Brian Howe.

The Secretary of the Department was Anthony Stuart Cole.

References

Ministries established in 1993
Health, Housing, Local Government and Community Services
1993 establishments in Australia
1993 disestablishments in Australia